Rüti railway station may refer to:

 Rüti GL railway station, in the Swiss canton of Glarus
 Rüti ZH railway station, in the Swiss canton of Zurich